Bread is a British television sitcom, written by Carla Lane, about a close-knit, working-class family in Liverpool. 74 episodes aired, over 7 series and 3 specials, between 1986 and 1991.

Series overview

Episodes

Series 1 (1986)

Series 2 (1987)

Series 3 (1987)

Series 4 (1988)

Special (1988)

Series 5 (1989)

Special (1989)

Series 6 (1990)

Special (1990)

Series 7 (1991)

References

Sources

Lists of British sitcom episodes